Marc Trevor Tessier-Lavigne  (born December 18, 1959) is a Canadian-American neuroscientist who is the 11th and current president of Stanford University. 

Previously, he was a professor at the University of California, San Francisco and then president of Rockefeller University in New York City. He was formerly executive vice president for research and chief scientific officer at Genentech. He is a member of the Cure Alzheimer's Fund's Scientific Advisory Board. As of 2021, he is on the boards of directors of Denali Therapeutics and Regeneron Pharmaceuticals, as well as the scientific advisory boards of Denali Therapeutics and Agios Pharmaceuticals. 

In 2022, Stanford University opened an investigation into allegations of Tessier-Lavigne's involvement in fabricating results in articles published between 2001 and 2008.  The investigation was ongoing as of March 6, 2023.

Early life and education 
Tessier-Lavigne was born in Trenton, Ontario, Canada. He grew up in Europe from ages 7 to 17, where his father was serving with NATO as part of the Canadian Armed Forces. He was the first in his family to attend college. 

Tessier-Lavigne received a Bachelor of Science with a major in physics from McGill University in 1980, a Bachelor of Arts with a major in philosophy and physiology from the University of Oxford in 1982, and a Doctor of Philosophy in physiology from University College London in 1987.

Tessier-Lavigne attended the University of Oxford on a Rhodes Scholarship, where he "first encountered the nervous system and fell in love with it," graduating with first-class honors. His doctoral advisor at University College London was David Attwell. He did postdoctoral research at the MRC Developmental Neurobiology Unit at University College London in 1987 and at the Center for Neurobiology and Behavior at Columbia University with Thomas Jessell from 1987 to 1991.

Career

Early Career: UCSF, Stanford and Genentech
Tessier-Lavigne started his career at the University of California, San Francisco from 1991 to 2001, and at Stanford University starting in 2001. Genentech hired him in 2003 as its senior vice president of Research Drug Discovery. He cited the firm's "potential to create breakthrough therapies for unmet medical needs" as his reason for leaving academia. His research on the development of the brain has uncovered details of how Alzheimer's disease is triggered.

Rockefeller University

In 2011 Tessier-Lavigne joined Rockefeller University as its 10th president, succeeding Paul Nurse, who returned to Britain to take over as president of the Royal Society. Rockefeller University called Tessier-Lavigne, who supervised a team of 1,400 researchers, the "Board's unanimous first choice for the position". He would be the first high-ranking science employee to leave Genentech following its acquisition by Roche in March 2009. The departure of Tessier-Lavigne from Genentech raised concerns that the company — described by The New York Times as being "among the most innovative and successful biotechnology companies in the world" — would see a negative effect on its scientific culture. Tessier-Lavigne stated that his choice to leave Genentech was unrelated to the Roche merger and that "this is probably the only job that could have lured me away from Genentech." Russell L. Carson, chairman of the board of trustees at Rockefeller University, said that he had "literally called him cold" to offer him the position and that Tessier-Lavigne had the strong scientific background needed to oversee the 70 independent laboratories that operate within the university and whose heads report directly to the president. Richard Scheller, Tessier-Lavigne's superior, called the move "part of the tradition of exchange between academia and Genentech." While it was too early to discuss specific goals, Tessier-Lavigne said that he hoped to work on transforming basic science into treatments for disease.

Tessier-Lavigne is also a member of the Xconomists, an ad hoc team of editorial advisors for the tech news and media company, Xconomy.

Stanford University and research controversy

On February 4, 2016, Stanford University announced that Tessier-Lavigne would become Stanford's 11th president, succeeding John L. Hennessy. In November 2020 he was appointed an Officer of the Order of Canada, one of that nation's highest honors, "for his groundbreaking contributions to developmental neuroscience, and his renowned academic leadership and strong advocacy of science." 

In November 2022, Stanford announced that its Board of Trustees would oversee an examination of Tessier-Lavigne's publications, "over allegations that neurobiology papers that he co-authored contain multiple manipulated images". Scientific integrity consultant Elisabeth Bik had raised concerns about four papers (in such journals as Science and Nature) that were co-authored by Tessier-Lavigne, findings which were confirmed by The Stanford Daily. Tessier-Lavigne has vehemently denied allegations of any falsification of data, "This is a breathtakingly outrageous set of claims that are completely and utterly false."

Honours 
Honorary degree, University of Pavia, 2006.
Member of the American Academy of Arts and Sciences, elected 2013
Elected to the American Philosophical Society, 2017.
Appointed an Officer of the Order of Canada, 2020.
Tessier-Lavigne has been also elected a member of the United States National Academy of Sciences and its Institute of Medicine and as a fellow of the American Association for the Advancement of Science, a fellow of the Royal Society of Canada, a fellow of the Royal Society and the Academy of Medical Sciences in the United Kingdom, an honorary graduand of University College London, and an honorary fellow of New College, Oxford.
Tessier-Lavigne became an international fellow at the Royal Swedish Academy of Engineering Sciences (IVA) in 2020.
Tessier-Lavigne received the Golden Plate Award of the American Academy of Achievement presented by Awards Council member Justice Anthony Kennedy in 2022.

Personal life 
Tessier-Lavigne met his wife, Mary Hynes, as a postdoc at Columbia. They have three children, Christian, Kyle, and Ella.

References 

1959 births
Living people
Alumni of New College, Oxford
Alumni of University College London
Canadian expatriate academics in the United States
Canadian Rhodes Scholars
Fellows of the Academy of Medical Sciences (United Kingdom)
Fellows of the American Association for the Advancement of Science
Canadian Fellows of the Royal Society
Fellows of the Royal Society of Canada
McGill University Faculty of Science alumni
Members of the United States National Academy of Sciences
Presidents of Rockefeller University
University of California, San Francisco faculty
People from Quinte West
Canadian neuroscientists
Stanford University faculty
Stanford University Department of Biology faculty
Stanford University School of Medicine faculty
Genentech people
Pfizer people
Presidents of Stanford University
Fellows of the American Academy of Arts and Sciences
Members of the American Philosophical Society
Members of the National Academy of Medicine
Officers of the Order of Canada